Mike Mullin may refer to:

 Mike Mullin (bowler), American ten-pin bowler
 Michael P. Mullin (born 1981), Virginia politician
 Mike Mullin (author), young adult fiction writer

See also
 Michael Mullen (disambiguation)